Jean-Baptiste Rondelet (4 June 1743 – 25 September 1829) was an architectural theorist of the late Enlightenment era and chief architect of the church of Sainte-Geneviève after the death of Jacques Germain Soufflot of cancer in 1780.

Rondelet published a treatise on architecture between 1805 and 1816.

References

 Frängsmyr, Tore, J. L. Heilbron & Robin E. Rider (eds.), The Quantifying Spirit in the Eighteenth Century. Berkeley:  University of California Press,  c1990.
 

1743 births
1829 deaths
Architects from Lyon
18th-century French architects
19th-century French architects
Architectural theoreticians
Members of the Académie des beaux-arts
Chevaliers of the Légion d'honneur